Surobash (also Romanized as Sūrobāsh; also known as Sarv, Sarvbāsh, Sorūbāsh, and Surubāsh) is a village in Kushk-e Nar Rural District, Kushk-e Nar District, Parsian County, Hormozgan Province, Iran. At the 2006 census, its population was 525, in 101 families.

References 

Populated places in Parsian County